Stipe (surname) is a surname. Notable people with the surname include:

Lynda Stipe (born 1962), American singer and bass guitarist
Michael Stipe (born 1960), lead singer of American rock band R.E.M
Gene Stipe (1926–2012), American politician
Reginald Stipe (1883–1976), Canadian politician and physician